The 1954–55 Australians lost 3–1 to the touring England team in the 1954–55 Ashes series. The Australian teams of the 1940s and early 1950s were strong even after the retirement of Don Bradman as many of his great 1948 side remained. Australia had lost only one series since 1932–33, when they lost he Ashes to Len Hutton in the exceptionally close fought 1953 Ashes series, but had played no Test cricket since. They had thrashed John Goddard's West Indian team 4–1 in 1951–52 after his triumphant 3–1 win in England, but had surprisingly been held to a 2–2 series draw against Jack Cheetham's South Africans in 1952–53. The general opinion in Australia was that they would win the return series, especially after the great victory in the First Test. "Although Australian batting was unsound by the old standards the presence of more all-rounders gave them the slightly better chance" wrote E.W. Swanton "all-rounders are said to hold the key to Test matches. Australia had four or five to England's one..."

The Captain

When Lindsay Hassett retired after the 1953 Ashes Series his vice-captain Arthur Morris was not appointed to succeed him because he was not a state captain. In 1954–55 Australia had not played a Test series since and the selectors were divided as to who should be captain. As with everything else down under cricket was divided between the power centres of Sydney, New South Wales and Melbourne, Victoria. The fast bowling all-rounder Keith Miller was captain of New South Wales and the winner of the 1954–55 Sheffield Shield. He had the obvious advantage of being an automatic selection for the Australian team, and was a charismatic and inspirational leader on the field. Against him was his cavalier approach to the game and that he was little inclined to enforce discipline. His rival was the captain of Victoria, the off-spinner Ian Johnson. Johnson had been little used on the 1948 tour and was left behind in 1953 and was not an automatic selection for the Test team. However, he was the son of the Test selector William Johnson, had attended the elite Wesley College. Lindsay Hassett and the chairman of selectors Don Bradman favoured Johnson and he was appointed captain by the A.C.B. Unlike Miller he was seen as a safe pair of hands and he was an astute captain and a fine ambassador for Australian cricket, but not everybody was happy with the choice. Frank Tyson reckoned that his innings victory in the First Test cost Australia the series as it confirmed Johnson in the captaincy, whereas Miller might have won the next three vital Tests. As it was vice-captain Arthur Morris was blamed for the defeat in Sydney and (strangely) Melbourne and the selectors stuck by Johnson. He went on to captain the successful Australian tour of the West Indies in 1954–55, where his diplomacy ensured that he did not suffer the same problems as Len Hutton in 1953–54, and his captaincy was considered to be equal to that of Richie Benaud. He retired after the Australian tour of England, Pakistan and India in 1956, where he again failed to regain the Ashes after being 1–0 up in the series.

The Batting
The weakness of the Australian team was their batting, Don Bradman (99.94), Sid Barnes (63.05) and Lindsay Hassett (46.56) had all retired and had not been adequately replaced. Arthur Morris (46.48) and Neil Harvey (48.42) were still in the team and made centuries in the 1st Test, but Morris had been dropped off Alec Bedser on 0 then failed 6 times and before being dropped himself. Harvey made a brave, undefeated 92 at Sydney against the pace of Tyson and Statham and was the only specialist batsman to play in all five Tests, but he also failed at the end. Of the other batsmen only Colin McDonald in the last two Tests was able to stand up to the England attack. Australia did have strength in depth, Keith Miller (36.97), Alan Davidson (24.59), Ron Archer (24.58), Richie Benaud (24.45) and Ray Lindwall (21.15) were all-rounders of Test class, but lacked the skills to master high class pace and only Lindwall (64 not out at Brisbane) made fifty. Captain Ian Johnson topped the Australian batting averages (116 at 58.00) by dint of batting at number ten and being not out 4 times in 6 innings.

The Bowling
The home side were still able to call on the great bowlers of Don Bradman's Great 1948 Team; the hostile pace of Ray Lindwall (23.03) and Keith Miller (22.97), the left-arm swing and left arm spin of Bill Johnston (23.91) and the flighted off-spinners of Ian Johnson. Ray Lindwall was regarded as the finest fast bowler after the war, with a perfectly controlled action, Frank Tyson writing "he appears to be just jogging his fifteen yards up to the stumps – until the last couple of strides of his approach, when he suddenly explodes into his delivery stride...when he releases the ball, his bowling arm is so low that it borders on the round-arm". Particularly dangerous was his late in-swinging yorker and "who is not 'Lindy's bunny' when he slots his yorker in the right spot?". Keith Miller was a batsman who had developed his bowling at the request of Don Bradman, famously mercurial he usually bowled fast seamers, but liked to mix in off-spin and leg-spin and sometimes when returning to his mark would suddenly turn and bowl off a couple of paces to see if he could catch the batsmen by surprise. "Big Bill" Johnston was a powerful left arm swing bowler who had been Australia's best wicket-taker three series in a row. He would do so again with 19 wickets at 22.26 and was the only Australian to take 5 wickets in a single innings (5/85 at Melbourne), but this was a testament to the strength of the Australian bowling as the wickets were usually shared around. Like Miller he could bowl spin, but instead of mixing his bowling he saved his slow left arm spinners for when the opposition were caught on a sticky wicket. The captain Ian Johnson was an off-spinner, a rarity in Australian cricket which tended to prefer leg-spinners. He was not a big spinner of the ball, and one of the slowest bowlers in cricket, but he used flight to deceive the batsmen and tied down one end while the fast bowlers rested. To these veterans could be added the exceptional promise of three talented young all-rounders; the fast seam bowler Ron Archer (27.45), who topped the bowling averages (13 wickets at 16.53), the fast-medium left-arm swing bowler of Alan Davidson (20.53) and the leg-spinner Richie Benaud (27.03). Unfortunately for the Australians Davidson and Benaud had yet to mature as bowlers, Lindwall, Miller, Johnson and Davidson all carried injuries and only Benaud played in all five Tests.

The Fielding
Australians regard fielding as a love, not a task. Every aspiring young Australian knows he must be a fielding specialist to get into a Test team and so he goes to work accordingly.
Jack Fingleton

Gil Langley of South Australia had taken over from the great Don Tallon as Australia's wicket-keeper, but he was injured and replaced by Len Maddocks of Victoria, who was kept due to his superior batsmanship. They were good keepers and few chances went begging when they were behind the stumps. In the field the Australians were far superior to the England side – the 1953 Australians were considered to be the best fielding team ever to tour England. – and they trained hard to improve their performance. Neil Harvey in the covers and "the Claw" Alan Davidson in any close catching position were outstanding, Ian Johnson was a good slip fielder and Richie Benaud an excellent gully fieldsman.

The Australian Team
Below are the Test statistics of the Australian Test team. All Australian cricketers were amateurs who were only paid expenses until World Series Cricket in 1977–79.

First Test – Brisbane

See Main Article – 1954–55 Ashes series

Second Test – Sydney

See Main Article – 1954–55 Ashes series

Third Test – Melbourne

See Main Article – 1954–55 Ashes series

Fourth Test – Adelaide

See Main Article – 1954–55 Ashes series

Fifth Test – Sydney

See Main Article – 1954–55 Ashes series

References

Bibliography
 E.W. Swanton, Swanton in Australia with MCC 1946–1975, Fontana/Collins, 1975
 Frank Tyson, In the Eye of the Typhoon: The Inside Story of the MCC Tour of Australia and New Zealand 1954/55, Parrs Wood Press, 2004

Further reading
 John Arlott, Australian Test Journal. A Diary of the Test Matches Australia v. England 1954–55, The Sportsman's Book Club, 1956
 John Arlott, John Arlott's 100 Greatest Batsmen, MacDonald Queen Anne Press, 1986
 Peter Arnold, The Illustrated Encyclopedia of World Cricket, W. H. Smith, 1985
 Sidney Barnes, The Ashes Ablaze: The M. C. C. Australian tour, 1954–55, Kimber, 1955
 Ashley Brown, The Pictorial History of Cricket, Bison, 1988
 Bill Frindall, The Wisden Book of Test Cricket 1877–1978, Wisden, 1979
 Arthur Gilligan, The Urn Returns: A Diary of the 1954–55 M. C. C. Tour of Australia, Deutsch, 1955
 Tom Graveney and Norman Miller, The Ten Greatest Test Teams  Sidgewick and Jackson, 1988
 Chris Harte, A History of Australian Cricket, Andre Deutsch, 1993
 Alan Hill, Daring Young Men: MCC Tour to Australia – 1954–55, Methuen Publishing Ltd, 2004
 Ken Kelly and David Lemmon, Cricket Reflections : Five Decades of Cricket Photographs, Heinemann, 1985
 Keith Miller, Cricket Crossfire, Oldbourne Press, 1956
 Ian Peebles, The Ashes 1954–55, Hodder and Stoughton, 1955
 Playfair Cricket Annual 1955
 Ray Robinson, On Top Down Under, Cassell, 1975
 Alan Ross, Australia 55: A Journal of the M.C.C. Tour, Joseph, 1955
 E.W. Swanton and C.B. Fry, Test Matches of 1954/55 Victory in Australia, The Daily Telegraph, 1955
 E.W. Swanton (ed), Barclay's World of Cricket, Willow, 1986
 Roy Webber, The Australians in England, A Record of the 21 Australian Cricket Tours of England 1878–1953, Hodder & Stoughton, 1953
 Crawford White, England Keep the Ashes: The Record of the England and M. C. C. Tour of Australia, 1954–55, News Chronicle, 1955
 Bob Willis and Patrick Murphy, Starting With Grace: A Pictorial Celebration of Cricket, 1864–1986, Stanley Paul, 1986
 Wisden Cricketers' Almanack 1956, "MCC in Australia and New Zealand, 1954–55"

1954 in Australian cricket
1955 in Australian cricket
Australian cricket seasons from 1945–46 to 1969–70